National Tertiary Route 730, or just Route 730 (or ) is a National Road Route of Costa Rica, located in the Alajuela province.

Description
In Alajuela province the route covers Upala canton (Upala, Canalete districts).

References

Highways in Costa Rica